Barbara Demick is an American journalist. She was the Beijing bureau chief of the Los Angeles Times.  She is the author of Logavina Street: Life and Death in a Sarajevo Neighborhood (Andrews & McMeel, 1996). Her second book, Nothing to Envy: Ordinary Lives in North Korea, was published by Spiegel & Grau/Random House in December 2009 and Granta Books in 2010. An animated feature film based on the book and sharing the same title was planned to be directed by Andy Glynne. The project launched in 2012 and a pilot was released in 2015. Its status  is not clear.

Biography
Demick grew up in Ridgewood, New Jersey. She attended Yale University, graduating with a bachelor's degree in economic history.

Derrick was a correspondent for The Philadelphia Inquirer in Eastern Europe from 1993 to 1997. Along with photographer John Costello, she produced a series of articles that ran 1994-1996 following life on one Sarajevo street over the course of the war in Bosnia. The series won the George Polk Award for international reporting, the Robert F. Kennedy Journalism Award for international reporting and was a finalist for the Pulitzer in the features category. She was stationed in the Middle East for the newspaper between 1997 and 2001.

In 2001, Demick moved to the Los Angeles Times and became the newspaper's first bureau chief in Korea. Demick reported extensively on human rights in North Korea, interviewing large numbers of refugees in China and South Korea. She focused on economic and social changes inside North Korea and on the situation of North Korean women sold into marriages in China. She wrote an extensive series of articles about life inside the North Korean city of Chongjin. In 2005, Demick was a co-winner of the American Academy of Diplomacy's Arthur Ross Award for Distinguished Reporting & Analysis on Foreign Affairs. In 2006, her reports about North Korea won the Overseas Press Club's Joe and Laurie Dine Award for Human Rights Reporting and the Asia Society's Osborn Elliott Prize for Excellence in Asian Journalism. That same year, Demick was also named print journalist of the year by the Los Angeles Press Club. In 2010, she won the Samuel Johnson Prize for Non-Fiction for her work, Nothing to Envy: Ordinary Lives in North Korea. The book was also a finalist for the U.S.'s most prestigious literary prize, the National Book Award. and for the National Book Critics Circle Award. Her first book, Logavina Street, is being republished in an updated edition in April 2012 by Spiegel & Grau, a division of Random House. 
Granta is publishing in the U.K. under the title, Besieged: Life Under Fire on a Sarajevo Street.
 In July 2020, her book Eat the Buddha: Life and Death in a Tibetan Town, was published by Random House, focusing on the life of Tibetan people in Ngaba, Sichuan, China.

Demick was a visiting professor at Princeton University in 2006-2007 teaching Coverage of Repressive Regimes through the Ferris Fellowship at the Council of the Humanities. She moved to Beijing for the Los Angeles Times in 2007. She is also an occasional contributor to The New Yorker.

Awards and nominations

 2012 Shorenstein Award for Asia coverage Stanford University
 2012 International Human Rights Book Award for German-edition of Nothing to Envy.
 2011 Finalist, National Book Critics Circle award for non-fiction.
 2011 Finalist, National Book Award for non-fiction
 2010: Awarded, BBC Samuel Johnson Prize for Non-Fiction, Nothing to Envy: Ordinary Lives in North Korea
 2006: Awarded, Overseas Press Club's Joe and Laurie Dine Award for Human Rights Reporting
 2006: Awarded, Asia Society's Osborn Elliott Prize for Excellence in Asian Journalism
 2006: Awarded, Los Angeles Press Club Print Journalist of the Year
 2005: Awarded, American Academy of Diplomacy's Arthur Ross Award for Distinguished Reporting & Analysis on Foreign Affairs
 1994: Awarded, George Polk Awards, The Philadelphia Inquirer
 1994: Awarded, Robert F. Kennedy Journalism Award, The Philadelphia Inquirer
 1994: Nominated, Pulitzer Prize, The Philadelphia Inquirer

References

External links 

 Spiegel & Grau 
 Barbara Demick, Nothing to Envy: Ordinary lives in North Korea, on Amazon.com 

 Website for Nothing to Envy
 Excerpt of Nothing to Envy in The Paris Review. Fall 2009
 Excerpt of Nothing to Envy in The New Yorker. Nov. 2, 2009
 Video: Barbara Demick discusses Nothing to Envy at the Asia Society, New York, Jan. 7, 2010

American women journalists
Living people
Experts on North Korea
Year of birth missing (living people)
Place of birth missing (living people)
People from Ridgewood, New Jersey
Yale College alumni
21st-century American women